Carreau fluid in physics is a type of generalized Newtonian fluid where viscosity, depends upon the shear rate, by the following equation:

 = viscosity at zero shear rate (Pa.s)

 = viscosity at infinite shear rate (Pa.s)

 = characteristic time (s)

 = power index

The dynamics of fluid motions is an important area of physics, with many important and commercially significant applications.

Computers are often used to calculate the motions of fluids, especially when the applications are of a safety critical nature.

Carreau Fluid Shear Rates
 At low shear rate a Carreau fluid behaves as a Newtonian fluid with viscosity .
 At intermediate shear rates, a Carreau fluid behaves as a Power-law fluid.
 At high shear rate, which depends on the power index  and the infinite shear-rate viscosity , a Carreau fluid behaves as a Newtonian fluid again with viscosity .

Origin of Carreau Fluid Model
The model was first proposed by Pierre Carreau.

See also

Navier-Stokes equations
Fluid
Cross fluid
Power-law fluid
Generalized Newtonian fluid

References

Kennedy, P. K., Flow Analysis of Injection Molds. New York. Hanser. 

Non-Newtonian fluids